TAUM (Traduction Automatique à l'Université de Montréal) is the name of a research group which was set up at the Université de Montréal in 1965. Most of its research was done between 1968 and 1980. 

It gave birth to the TAUM-73 and TAUM-METEO machine translation prototypes, using the Q-Systems programming language created by Alain Colmerauer, which were among the first attempts to perform automatic translation through linguistic analysis. The prototypes were never used in actual production.

The TAUM-METEO name has been erroneously used for many years to designate the METEO System subsequently developed by John Chandioux.

External links 
 www.chin.gc.ca, Canadian Heritage Information Network, CHIN, 2003 

Computational linguistics
Machine translation